Rew is a census-designated place (CDP) in Foster Township, McKean County in the U.S. state of Pennsylvania. The community is almost halfway between Bradford and the borough and county seat of Smethport.

A notable attraction in Rew is the Bradford Speedway, location of a 1958 NASCAR race won by Junior Johnson.

Geography 
Rew is located at the summit of a steep hill, where Pennsylvania Routes 46 and 646 intersect. It is located near the triple boundary of Foster, Otto and Keating Townships.

Demographics 
As of the 2010 census, the population of Rew was 199, and was estimated 135 in the 2019 estimate. Every resident (100%) in the town was Caucasian. The median age and male ratio were also high, at 54.7 and 1:8:1, respectively.

References

Census-designated places in McKean County, Pennsylvania
Census-designated places in Pennsylvania